Steele is an unincorporated community in Pike County, Kentucky. Steele has a post office with ZIP code 41566, which opened on February 5, 1906.

References

Unincorporated communities in Pike County, Kentucky
Unincorporated communities in Kentucky